Thliptoceras sinensis is a moth in the family Crambidae. It was described by Aristide Caradja in 1925. It is found in China in Shanghai, Zhejiang, Fujian, Jiangxi, Guangdong, Guangxi, Hainan and Guizhou.

The wingspan is 24–27 mm.

References

Moths described in 1925
Pyraustinae